Lynton Yates Ballentine (April 6, 1899 – July 19, 1964) was a North Carolina dairyman, farmer and politician, who served as the 20th Lieutenant Governor of North Carolina from 1945 to 1949 and as the 12th North Carolina Commissioner of Agriculture from 1949 until his death on July 19, 1964.

Early life
Ballentine, also known by the nickname "Stag," was born on April 6, 1899 to James Erastus and Lillian (Yates) Ballentine on a farm in Varina, North Carolina.

Education
Ballentine attended Oakwood and Cardenas Elementary Schools and from 1913-1917 Holly Springs High School.  In 1921 Ballentine received his B.A. in Political Economy from Wake Forest College.

Early political career
After graduating from Wake Forest College, Ballentine returned home to help operate the family dairy farm. Ballentine was active in the North Carolina Democratic Party, and was elected to the Wake County Board of Commissioners and to the North Carolina Senate before seeking statewide office.

Death
Ballentine died on July 19, 1964 of coronary thrombosis, coronary atherosclerosis in White Sulphur Springs, West Virginia.

See also
1944 North Carolina lieutenant gubernatorial election

End Notes

References
OurCampaigns.com
NC State Archives
NC Agricultural Hall of Fame

North Carolina Commissioners of Agriculture
1899 births
1964 deaths
County commissioners in North Carolina
Democratic Party North Carolina state senators
Lieutenant Governors of North Carolina
Wake Forest University alumni
People from Fuquay-Varina, North Carolina
Deaths from coronary thrombosis
20th-century American politicians